Lək (also, Lyak, Lyaki, and Lyala) is a village and municipality in the Samukh Rayon of Azerbaijan.  It has a population of 1,137.

References 

Populated places in Samukh District